{{Infobox album
| name       = Mr. Scarface Is Back
| type       = studio
| artist     = Scarface
| cover      = Scarface - Mr. Scarface Is Back.jpg
| alt        =
| released   = October 8, 1991
| recorded   = 
| venue      =
| studio     =
| genre      = *Gangsta rap
Boom bap<ref>

Mr. Scarface Is Back is the debut studio album by American rapper Scarface. It was released on October 8, 1991, by Rap-A-Lot Records and Priority Records. The album was supported by two singles: "Mr. Scarface" and "A Minute to Pray and a Second to Die". Both of these singles attained minor success on the charts.

The album peaked at number 51 on the US Billboard 200 on November 9, 1991. On April 23, 1993, the album was certified gold by the Recording Industry Association of America (RIAA).

Track listing

Notes
The tracks "The Pimp" and "Your Ass Got Took" were omitted from the clean version of the album.

Charts

Weekly charts

Year-end charts

Certifications

References

1991 debut albums
Scarface (rapper) albums
Rap-A-Lot Records albums